I Love the '80s is a BBC television nostalgia  series that examines the pop culture of the 1980s. It was commissioned following the success of I Love the '70s and is part of the I Love... series. I Love 1980 premiered on BBC Two on 13 January 2001 and the last, I Love 1989, on 24 March 2001. Unlike with I Love the '70s, episodes were increased to 90 minutes long. The series was followed later in 2001 by I Love the '90s.  The success of the series led to VH1 remaking the show for the US market: I Love the '80s USA, which is known simply as "I Love the '80s" in the US itself. The following repeat version in 2001 was cut down to an hour per year, then in 2019, the series was repeated again, this time cut down into a 30 minutes per year "highlights" version removing certain pop-culture and/or contributors.

Contributors
The series used many regular contributors, which included Peter Kay, Clare Grogan, Dee Hepburn, Kate Thornton, Stuart Maconie, Emma B, Ice-T, Toyah Willcox, Tommy Vance, Tara Palmer-Tomkinson, Ross Noble, Jamie Theakston, and many others.

Episode guide

I Love 1980 - broadcast: 13 January 2001
Presented by Larry Hagman. Opening titles: "Call Me" by Blondie. Ending credits: "Jump to the Beat" by Stacy Lattisaw.
The episode features (in the order shown in episode):

 Fame
 The Gap Band - "Oops Up Side Your Head / Liquid Gold / Kelly Marie
 Diff'rent Strokes
 Pac-Man (one of the first popular computer games in Britain)
 Metal Mickey
 Kickers shoes
 Synthpop / The Human League / OMD
 Pierrot
 Roald Dahl's Tales of the Unexpected
 Alton Towers (theme park which had opened on the border of Staffordshire and Derbyshire)
 Clothing labels: Pringle, Kappa, Fred Perry,
 Barbara Woodhouse training dogs
 Catsuit / Sheena Easton
 The Face
 Moscow Olympic Games (the first to be hosted in a communist country)
 Who shot J. R.? / Dallas (whodunnit storyline in popular USA soap opera)

Flashback commercial of 1980: Monster Munch - Three Monsters (actually aired in 1978).

I Love 1981 - broadcast: 20 January 2001
Presented by Adam Ant. Opening titles: "Prince Charming" by Adam and the Ants. Ending credits: "Swords of a Thousand Men" by Tenpole Tudor.
The episode features (in the order shown in episode):

 Adam and the Ants
 Magnum, P.I.
 Wedding of Charles, Prince of Wales, and Lady Diana Spencer
 Valentine's Day
 Porky's
 Shakin' Stevens (early successes of the popular Welsh singer)
 Danger Mouse
 Executive toys
 Kim Wilde (young female pop star)
 Eric Bristow
 Bullseye
 Chocolate biscuits
 New Romantic (pop culture style)
 Pencil case: smelly rubbers, food stationery 
 Protect and Survive and Threads (originally aired in 1984)
 Gregory's Girl / Clare Grogan

Flashback commercial of 1981: Kit Kat - Pop Band (actually aired in 1984).

I Love 1982 - broadcast: 3 February 2001
Presented by Dave Lee Travis, Mike Read and Tommy Vance in TOTP set. Opening titles: "Fantastic Day" by Haircut 100. Ending credits: "Poison Arrow" by ABC.
The episode features (in the order shown in episode):

 The Young Ones
 Hair styles: Mullet, Jheri curl
 Rambo
 Boy George 
 Deely Bobber
 BMX bike / Kelloggs Frosties animated advert - Tony the Tiger on bike
 Sandwich toaster / Breville Snack 'n' Sandwich Toaster animated advert - Crying sandwich in fridge (actually aired in 1981)
 Musical Youth
 E.T. the Extra-Terrestrial
 School uniforms
 Boys from the Blackstuff
 Bubble gum
 Bananarama
 Alex Higgins
 Rah-rah skirt
 Imagination

I Love 1983 - broadcast: 10 February 2001
Presented by Roland Rat. Opening titles: "Karma Chameleon" by Culture Club. Ending credits: "Calling Your Name" by Marilyn.
The episode features (in the order shown in episode):

 Knight Rider
 Cabbage Patch Kids
 Flashdance
 Public display of affection 
 Roland Rat / TV-am
 Leg warmers
 Wham!
 Sloane Ranger
 He-Man and the Masters of the Universe
 Keep fit
 Break dancing
 Just Seventeen
 Blockbusters (new TV gameshow aired on ITV)
 Thriller

I Love 1984 - broadcast: 17 February 2001
Presented by Holly Johnson. Opening titles: "Two Tribes" by Frankie Goes to Hollywood. Ending credits: "Wood Beez (Pray Like Aretha Franklin)" by Scritti Politti.
The episode features (in the order shown in episode):

 The A-Team
 Nik Kershaw
 Roller disco
 Tucker's Luck
 Madonna
 Videotape / Video Nasties
 Torvill and Dean
 Trivial Pursuit
 Paul Weller / The Style Council / Jazz pop / Sade
 Robin of Sherwood
 Dungeons & Dragons
 Care Bears
 The Smiths / Morrissey
 Transformers
 The Brat Pack
 Katharine Hamnett (Slogan T-shirts)
 Frankie Goes to Hollywood

I Love 1985 - broadcast: 24 February 2001
Presented by Grace Jones. Opening titles: "Take On Me" by A-ha. Ending credits: "Let's Go Crazy" by Prince and the Revolution. 
The episode features (in the order shown in episode):

 Grace Jones
 Levi 501
 Arnold Schwarzenegger
 McDonald's (fast food chain which had arrived in Britain in 1974 but was peaking in popularity by 1985)
 Bruce Springsteen
 My Beautiful Laundrette
 "19"
 Dr. Martens
 Goth culture
 Max Headroom
 Spot creams
 Miami Vice
 Perfume
 Prince
 Amusement arcades
 Spitting Image
 Live Aid

I Love 1986 - broadcast: 3 March 2001
Presented by Patsy Kensit. Opening titles: "Walk Like an Egyptian" by The Bangles. Ending credits: "Ain't Nothin' Goin' on But the Rent" by Gwen Guthrie.
The episode features (in the order shown in episode):

 Samantha Fox
 Essex girl
 Moonlighting
 Boxer shorts / Nick Kamen
 Crocodile Dundee
 Neighbours (Australian-based TV soap which was launched in its homeland in 1985 and first aired by the BBC in 1986)
 Men's bedroom designs
 Sigue Sigue Sputnik
 Panini (stickers)
 Absolute Beginners
 No Limits / Jenny Powell
 Power ballads
 Big glasses / Timmy Mallett
 Sunday Sport
 Five Star

I Love 1987 - broadcast: 10 March 2001
Presented by Richard E. Grant. Opening titles: "I Wanna Dance with Somebody (Who Loves Me)" by Whitney Houston. Ending credits: "Respectable" by Mel and Kim.
The episode features (in the order shown in episode):

 Terence Trent D'Arby
 Shellsuit / Bumbags
 Going Live
 Nouvelle cuisine
 Run DMC / Beastie Boys
 Withnail and I
 Head sports bags
 Network 7
 Puffball skirts
 Wall Street / Yuppies,
 Thirtysomething
 Pump trainers
 Brookside (Channel 4 TV soap which was first launched in 1982 and enjoyed its peak in popularity around 1987)
 Rick Astley

I Love 1988 - broadcast: 17 March 2001
Presented by Raphael and Leonardo of The Teenage Mutant Hero Turtles. Opening titles: "Get Outta My Dreams, Get into My Car" by Billy Ocean. Ending credits: "Tell It to My Heart" by Taylor Dayne.
The episode features (in the order shown in episode):
 
 Bros / Brother Beyond
 Harry Enfield - Loadsamoney
 Teenage Mutant Ninja Turtles
 This Morning
 Florence Griffith-Joyner
 Quiz machine - Give Us a Break
 Second Summer of Love
 Prisoner Cell Block H
 Inflatables at football matches
 Viz
 Debbie Gibson / Tiffany
 Sumo
 Bill and Ted
 Car accessories: Garfield, Mooning Man
 The Hit Man and Her

I Love 1989 - broadcast: 24 March 2001
Presented by Jason Donovan. Opening titles: "All Around the World" by Lisa Stansfield. Ending credits: "Days" by Kirsty MacColl.
The episode features (in the order shown in episode):

 Den Watts (the demise of the popular character "Dirty Den" in EastEnders)
 Lycra body
 Jason Donovan (Australian TV soap star who made his name as a pop star in 1989)
 Challenge Anneka (new TV series hosted by Anneka Rice)
 Mike Tyson vs Frank Bruno
 Decorating paint
 Soul II Soul
 Dancing flowers
 Guns N' Roses
 Shirley Valentine
 Crop circles
 Neneh Cherry
 Game Boy / Tetris (the latest popular computer games)
 Lambada
 Bodyform / Tampax / Bodyform advert
 Madchester (pop music and culture emerging in Manchester)

Flashback commercial of 1989: Carling Black Label - Mission Impossible Squirrel.

Repeats
The series was repeated on BBC Two in 2002. In 2019, the same channel broadcast edited episodes lasting thirty minutes.

See also
 I Love the '70s (British TV series)
 I Love the '90s (British TV series)

References

External links
 

Nostalgia television shows
BBC Television shows
2001 British television series debuts
2001 British television series endings
English-language television shows